Withernsea Lifeboat Station is a Royal National Lifeboat Institution (RNLI) lifeboat station located in the town of Withernsea, East Riding of Yorkshire, England. It is one of four RNLI stations in the East Riding of Yorkshire, with another five in North Yorkshire.

A lifeboat was located at Withernsea between 1862 and 1913. Then again from 1974 until the present day.

History
A lifeboathouse was built in 1862 in Arthur Street in the town. It was also furnished with a sloping floor which allowed the water to drain away from underneath the boat.

The station was closed in 1913 in favour of a new location at  further down the coast. Launching had become difficult at Withernsea and most of the wrecks were occurring nearer to Easington than at Withernsea. Easington operated for twenty years before it was itself closed. Withernsea was re-activated in 1974 after a period of 60 years, in response to a national increase in pleasure craft and water-based activities closer to the shoreline.

Since the station re-opened in 1974, members of the team have been awarded eight gallantry awards, including two RNLI bronze medals. In 2017, the station had seventeen call-outs. Currently the Withernsea Lifeboat station operates an Inshore Lifeboat (ILB) with All-Weather Boat coverage being supplied by the two adjacent stations.

The fifth lifeboat house in Withernsea was opened in 1998, on the site of the 1974 building (boathouses had been built in 1861, 1882, 1974, 1983 and 1998). The octagonal lighthouse in the town of Withernsea, is now host to a lighthouse and lifeboat museum.

Withernsea is due to receive a new 'D'-Class lifeboat in July 2019; it will be named Mary Beal.

Notable rescues
One of the more unusual rescues that the Withernsea Lifeboat crew performed was in January 1989 when the minibus they were travelling in on the M1 motorway was caught up in the Kegworth Air Disaster. The crew assisted with the rescue effort at the roadside.

Fleet

References

Sources

External links

Lifeboat stations in Yorkshire
Buildings and structures in the East Riding of Yorkshire
Withernsea